Tony Trujillo (born August 23, 1982) is an American professional skateboarder and musician. Trujillo was awarded the "Skater of the Year" award by Thrasher magazine in 2002.

Early life
He started skating at the age of seven and Trujillo was often invited to skate on the ramps in his neighbor's barn. Trujillo started competing in skateboard contests in the California Amateur Skateboard League at the age of 12 years.

Professional skateboarding
At the age of fourteen, Trujillo was first sponsored by AntiHero and he was assigned professional status with the company two years later.

Trujillo has a signature shoe line with Vans and the company produced two commercials, shot by Stacy Peralta, to advertise the shoe (Trujillo appeared in both).

Trujillo appears as a playable character in the video game Tony Hawk's American Wasteland.

Sponsors
As of 2011, Trujillo is sponsored by AntiHero, Spitfire, Independent, Vans, and Fourstar.

Awards
On December 7, 2002, Thrasher announced that Trujillo had been voted the magazine's thirteenth annual Skater Of The Year.

Contest history

In August 2005, Trujillo placed 2nd in San Jose, CA in the Mountain Dew Tour. On August 3, 2008, Trujillo won bronze in X Games 14 Superpark competition.

Music
Trujillo played bass and sang in a band called "Bad Shit", Together with the late editor-in-chief of Thrasher magazine, Jake Phelps, and his wife, Ashley "Trixie" Trujillo. The band has toured both in the US and internationally.

Personal life

Trujillo is married to his drummer Ashley James, also known as Trixie Trujillo. They married May 6, 2008 after a Thrasher Skate Rock show in Reno, NV. They are parents to 
their son, Waylon, who was born in December 19, 2008. As of February 7, 2014, they had another son named Reno.

References

External links
Skatepark of Tampa profile

American skateboarders
Sportspeople from Santa Rosa, California
1982 births
Living people
American sportspeople of Mexican descent
Sportspeople from the San Francisco Bay Area